Kentucky Route 1819 (KY 1819) is a  state highway in the U.S. State of Kentucky. Its southern terminus is at KY 1531 in Louisville and its northern terminus is at U.S. Route 60 (US 60) in Louisville.

Major junctions

References

1819
1819
Transportation in Louisville, Kentucky